Schistura dorsizona is a species of ray-finned fish in the stone loach genus Schistura. It is known to occur in the Mekong basin in Laos and Cambodia, it is expected that it occurs in eastern Thailand too.

References 

D
Fish described in 1998